Aboh or Abo, is a city in Delta State of Nigeria. It is the center of the Aboh Kingdom in Ndokwa land. It is located at an elevation of about 24m above sea level and is the headquarters of Ndokwa East Local Government Area in Delta State.

There are various crude oil exploration and exploitation activities since the Aboh -1 exploration well was discovered in 1961.  This field among others have proved hydrocarbons intervals in a simple roll over type structural setting. The present king is  Obi Imegwu II.

References

Cities in Delta State
Towns in Delta State